Some philosophers and political scientists make a distinction between claim rights and liberty rights. A claim right is a right which entails responsibilities, duties, or obligations on other parties regarding the right-holder. In contrast, a liberty right is a right which does not entail obligations on other parties, but rather only freedom or permission for the right-holder. The distinction between these two senses of "rights" originates in American jurist Wesley Newcomb Hohfeld's analysis thereof in his seminal work Fundamental Legal Conceptions, As Applied in Judicial Reasoning and Other Legal Essays (1919).

Liberty rights and claim rights are the inverse of one another: a person has a liberty right permitting him to do something only if there is no other person who has a claim right forbidding him from doing so; and likewise, if a person has a claim right against someone else, that other person's liberty is thus limited. This is because the deontic concepts of obligation and permission are De Morgan dual; a person is permitted to do all and only the things he is not obliged to refrain from, and obliged to do all and only the things he is not permitted to refrain from.

Overview
A person's liberty right to x consists in his freedom to do or have x, while a person's claim right to x consists in an obligation on others to allow or enable him to do or have x. For example, to assert a liberty right to free speech is to assert that you have permission to speak freely; that is, that you are not doing anything wrong by speaking freely. But that liberty right does not in itself entail that others are obligated to help you communicate the things you wish to say, or even that they would be wrong in preventing you from speaking freely. To say these things would be to assert a claim right to free speech; to assert that others are obliged to refrain (i.e. prohibited) from preventing you from speaking freely (that is, that it would be wrong for them to do so) or even perhaps obliged to aid your efforts at communication (that is, it would be wrong for them to refuse such aid). Conversely, such claim rights do not entail liberty rights; e.g. laws prohibiting vigilante justice (establishing a legal claim right to be free thereof) do not thereby condone or permit all the acts which such violent enforcement might otherwise have prevented.

To illustrate: a world with only liberty rights, without any claim rights, would by definition be a world wherein everything was permitted and no act or omission was prohibited; a world wherein none could rightly claim that they had been wronged or neglected. Conversely, a world with only claim rights and no liberty rights would be a world wherein nothing was merely permitted, but all acts were either obligatory or prohibited. The assertion that people have a claim right to liberty – i.e. that people are obliged only to refrain from preventing each other from doing things which are permissible, their liberty rights limited only by the obligation to respect others' liberty – is the central thesis of liberal theories of justice.

Second-order rights
Hohfeld's original analysis included two other types of right: besides claims (or rights proper) and liberties (or privileges), he wrote of powers, and immunities. The other two terms of Hohfeld's analysis, powers and immunities, refer to second-order liberties and claims, respectively. Powers are liberty rights regarding the modification of first-order rights, e.g. the U.S. Congress has certain powers to modify some of U.S. citizens' legal rights, inasmuch as it can impose or remove legal duties. Immunities, conversely, are claim rights regarding the modification of first-order rights, e.g. U.S. citizens have, per their Constitution, certain immunities limiting the positive powers of the U.S. Congress to modify their legal rights. As such, immunities and powers are often subsumed within claims and liberties by later authors, or grouped together into "active rights" (liberties and powers) and "passive rights" (claims and immunities).

These different types of rights can be used as building blocks to explain relatively complex matters such as a particular piece of property. For example, a right to use one's computer can be thought of as a liberty right, but one has a power right to let somebody else use your computer (granting them a liberty right), as well as a claim right against others using the computer; and further, you may have immunity rights protecting your claims and liberties regarding the computer.

See also
Constitutionalism
Constitutional economics
Freedom versus license
Negative and positive rights
Rule according to higher law
Wesley Newcomb Hohfeld

References

External links
The Form of Rights: The Hohfeldian Analytical System, Rights section 2.1, Stanford Encyclopedia of Philosophy
Claim Rights & Liberty Rights, Human Rights section 3b, Internet Encyclopedia of Philosophy
The Difference Between a Right and Liberty, Professor William E. May

Human rights concepts
Rights
Identity politics